The BMW E21 is the first generation of the BMW 3 Series compact executive cars, which were produced from June 1975 to 1983 and replaced the BMW 02 Series. The series was exclusively built in a two-door sedan body style (except for convertibles made by Baur). Contrary to its predecessor, a 'Touring' body with a sloped rear hatch was no longer offered.

Initial models were produced with carburetted four-cylinder petrol engines of 1.6 L, 1.8 L, and 2.0 L. Fuel-injection was introduced in late 1975 on the 320i – but in 1977, a carburetted inline 6-cylinder engine replaced both the 320 and 320i models, while a detuned version of the four-cylinder injection went on sale in the United States. In 1978, the 3-series received its first fuel-injected six-cylinder in the 323i; and in 1981, a bottom end detuned 1.6 L was offered in the 315.

The cabriolet body style, manufactured by Baur, was produced from 1978 to 1981, with all available engines.

There was no BMW M3 model for the E21 generation, but several limited edition models were produced based on the model with the largest engine, the six-cylinder 323i.

The E21 was replaced by the E30 3 Series in 1982.

Development
Under the direction of its majority (51%) shareholder, Herbert Quandt, BMW decided upon a replacement for the ageing BMW 02 Series.

In July 1975, BMW's Board of Management introduced the E21 to the public at the Munich Olympic Stadium.

Styling 
The frontal view of the new car was dominated by the BMW trademark kidney grille standing out clearly from the radiator cover. The styling of the new car bore a resemblance to the E12 5 Series which was in production as the E21 was introduced. Like many other BMW models, the C-pillar of the E21 has a Hofmeister kink.

Paul Bracq, Director of Design at BMW from 1970 to 1974, is credited with setting the design direction of the E21.

The BMW E21 is according to the Design Museum London one of "fifty cars that changed the world".

Interior 
The cockpit design of the E21 marked the introduction of a new design concept, with the center console and central dashboard area angled towards the driver. This has become part of BMW's interior design philosophy for many years. As a sign of passive safety, all edges and control elements within the interior were rounded off and padded.

Engines

315 

The 315 was the base model from March 1981 to 1983 and remained on sale up into 1984 for some markets, alongside the new E30. It has a  version of the 316's 1.6-litre engine, tuned for fuel economy. In an effort to further lower the price, the 315 also had bumpers with exposed screws, a vinyl-covered parcel shelf (this was carpeted on all other E21 models), no map pockets on the doors, R2 double filament headlamps (rather than halogen units), and a single external mirror.

316 

The 316 was the base model for years 1975 to 1981, fitted with a  M10 engine producing .

In 1980 the engine size increased to 1.8 litres (after the 318 carburetor version was discontinued), while the model badge remained "316".

318 
The 318 was a mid-range model that was powered by a carburetted four-cylinder engine, producing .

318i 
In 1980, the carburetted 318 was dropped and replaced by the fuel injected 318i.

In Sweden, the 318i was badged 320i and had twin headlights.

320 

The initial 320 model was powered by a four-cylinder engine using a Solex 2-barrel downdraft carburettor.

320i 
The 320i was released in late 1975. It has a continuous port injection system (Bosch K-Jetronic) instead of a carburetor.

320/6 

In 1977, the 320 model switched from the BMW M10 four-cylinder engine to the BMW M20 straight-six petrol engine. Although they remained badged as "320", the six-cylinder model is often referred to as "320/6". The engine uses a Solex 4-barrel downdraft carburetor.

323i 
The 323i was the top E21 model following its introduction in 1977. It is powered by a 2.3-litre six-cylinder engine using Bosch K-Jetronic fuel-injection.

Transmissions 
 3-speed ZF 3HP22 automatic (318 and 320)
 4-speed Getrag 242 manual
 5-speed Getrag 245 manual, with either an overdrive fifth gear or close-ratio gearing (the latter available from 1976).

Chassis and suspension

The suspension incorporated rack and pinion steering and MacPherson strut suspension at the front, and semi-trailing arm type independent suspension at the rear. The rear suspension design causes camber changes, which can introduce "snap oversteer" at the handling limits. The power assisted brakes were discs on the front wheels, while the rear wheels had drum brakes (except the 323i model which had discs all round).

Model year changes 
At the E21's release, three models were available: with 316 (1.6-litre), 318 (1.8-litre) and 320 (2.0-litre) versions of the BMW M10 four-cylinder engine. To differentiate between models, the 320 model came with dual headlights, while the 316 and 318 had single headlights.

1975 
The fuel-injected 320i was introduced at the end of 1975. It has the M10 four-cylinder engine with Bosch K-Jetronic fuel injection, and a limited slip differential was available as an option.

1977 
At the 1977 International Auto Show in Frankfurt, BMW unveiled its new variants of the E21, featuring the new BMW M20 six-cylinder engines (which were initially called "M60").

The four-cylinder 320 model was replaced with the 320/6, featuring a 2.0 litre version of the M20 engine. The braking system was also upgraded, with the 323i featuring disc brakes on all wheels. Options include power steering, a 5-speed close-ratio 'dogleg' sport gearbox, and 25% limited slip differential.

1980 
For the 1980 model year, the four-cylinder models were upgraded: the 1.8 L carburetted M10 unit was revised to produce  and entered the market in the updated 316, while a fuel-injected version of the 1.8 L M10 was introduced in the 318i model (which replaced the carburetted 318 as the mid-range model). This fuel-injected 1.8 L M10 was also sold in Sweden with 320i badging (with a higher level of standard equipment to distinguish it from the 318i), because the 320/6 was never certified for sale there.

1981 
The economy model 315 was introduced as a reaction to the second "oil crisis" in late 1979. More spartan than the other E21 models, it was the last E21 to be built and produced alongside the early E30 models.

Baur TopCabriolet 

A cabriolet conversion was offered by Karosserie Baur, called the TopCabriolet. It consisted of a targa roof and an independent rear soft-top. The targa roof section was designed to fit in the trunk, while the boot cover doubled as a cover for the plastic rear windshield, protecting it from scratches and frost in winter. Production of the TopCabriolet began in 1978 and all engine options were available.

The cars were sold via the BMW dealership network and all Baur models included the BMW warranty. A total of 4,595 vehicles were manufactured before production ended in 1981.

North American models 

The E21 was sold in the United States from model years 1977 to 1983, first as the four-cylinder 320i, and from 1980 as the 1.8 liter 320is. Six-cylinder models were not sold in America, because the E21 versions of the M20 engine did not meet U.S. emissions regulations at the time. The 320i models sold in the United States have a thermal reactor as a pollution control device. U.S. models came standard with air conditioning.

From 1977 to 1979, the U.S. models were powered by a  fuel-injected version of the M10 four-cylinder engine. In August 1979, from the 1980 model year, the 320is model was released, powered by a downsized  version of the M10 four-cylinder engine. Just 2,500 320is's were produced.

Due to American regulations, the following changes were required:
 sealed beam headlights, larger indicator lights and side reflectors
 speedometer in miles-per-hour
 fuel gauge markings changed from litres to "full, ½, reserve"
 a detuned version of the M10 engine, initially using a thermal reactor to control exhaust emissions
 in 1980, the engine was downsized from 2.0 L to 1.8 L and the thermal reactor was replaced with a catalytic converter.

The optional "S Package" sacrificed the factory air conditioning, but offered Recaro sport seats, upgraded suspension in the form of a rear anti-roll bar and a stiffer front anti-roll bar, a 5-speed transmission and limited-slip differential, cross-spoke alloy wheels, a larger and more extensive tool kit, a dual operation manual sunroof, an AM/FM Blaupunkt radio with cassette player, fog lights, a 3-spoke leather-wrapped steering wheel and leather shift knob, a front air dam, a "delete" of the alphanumeric 320i markers on the rear trunk lid, a central-dash storage area where A/C controls were otherwise placed, and a limited color palette of white, silver or black.

Production 
Production of the E21 began in June 1975 and finished in December 1983. Total production estimates vary between 1,359,444 cars to 1,364,039 cars with the Baur TopCabriolet conversions (if not already included in initial BMW chassis numbers) .

The E21 was produced at the BMW plant in Munich, Germany. Models sold in Malaysia used complete knock-down kits produced in Germany, which were assembled in Kuching, Malaysia.

Motorsports 
The car was developed in only just over 12 weeks, without technical drawings. BMW Motorsport engineers simply carried out the modifications directly, with the car progressively taking its final shape.

The Group 5 320 was also used by the McLaren team in the American International Motor Sports Association series. It was also used by the BMW Junior Team, whose drivers included Manfred Winkelhock, Eddie Cheever, and Marc Surer. The 320 won its first race, at Zolder in 1977 with Marc Surer at the wheel. It also won the 1981 and 1982 Guia Race of Macau.

References

3 Series
E21
Cars introduced in 1975
1980s cars
Rear-wheel-drive vehicles
Sedans
Compact executive cars